The Lagos State Ministry of Local Government and Chieftaincy Affairs is the state government ministry, charged with the responsibility to plan, devise and implement the state policies on Local Government and Chieftaincy Affairs.

See also
Lagos State Ministry of Special Duties
Lagos State Executive Council

References

Government ministries of Lagos State